Again the Three Just Men is a 1928 British thriller novel by Edgar Wallace, sometimes known simply as Again the Three.

It is the last of six novels in the Four Just Men series, featuring a gang of vigilantes committed to fighting crime whatever the methods.

Film adaptation
The story provided loose inspiration for the 1966 film ''Circus of Fear.

References

External links
 

1928 British novels
British thriller novels
Novels by Edgar Wallace
Hodder & Stoughton books